e-Informatica Software Engineering Journal is a peer-reviewed open access academic journal on software engineering (especially in experimentation and machine learning). The journal was established in 2007 and is published by the Wrocław University of Science and Technology. The editors-in-chief are Zbigniew Huzar and Lech Madeyski.

Abstracting and indexing
The journal is abstracted and indexed by the Emerging Sources Citation Index, Scopus, Applied Science & Technology Source, Compendex, and Computer & Applied Sciences.

References

External links

Computer science journals
English-language journals
Publications established in 2007
Wrocław University of Science and Technology
Open access journals